White silky oak is a common name for several plants and may refer to:

Grevillea banksii (white-flowered form)
Grevillea hilliana, endemic to Australia
Stenocarpus sinuatus, native to Australia

See also
Silky oak (disambiguation)

Grevillea taxa by common name